Millu (Aymara for a kind of salpeter, Quechua for salty, Hispanicized spelling Millo) is a mountain in the Andes of southern Peru, about  high. It is located on the border of the Moquegua Region, General Sánchez Cerro Province, Ichuña District, and the Puno Region, Puno Province, San Antonio District. It lies southwest of the mountain Chuqipata.

References

Mountains of Moquegua Region
Mountains of Puno Region
Mountains of Peru